Taijuan Emmanuel Walker (born August 13, 1992) is a Mexican-American professional baseball pitcher for the Philadelphia Phillies of Major League Baseball (MLB). He has previously played in MLB for the Seattle Mariners, Arizona Diamondbacks, Toronto Blue Jays and New York Mets. Walker made his MLB debut in 2013 and was an All-Star in 2021.

Amateur career
Born in Shreveport, Louisiana, Walker's original love was basketball, until he began playing baseball at the age of 11. Walker attended Yucaipa High School in Yucaipa, California, where he was a pitcher and shortstop, as well as a two-sport athlete. At Yucaipa, Walker was teammates with Matt Davidson, a third baseman in the Los Angeles Dodgers organization. Yucaipa is also the alma mater of former major leaguers Corky Miller and Mark Teahen.

Professional career

Seattle Mariners
The Seattle Mariners selected Walker in the first round, with the 43rd overall pick, of the 2010 MLB draft. Walker and the Mariners agreed to a deal that included an $800,000 signing bonus. He made four appearances for the Rookie League AZL Mariners, all in relief, and went 1–1 with a 1.29 earned run average (ERA). Walker was listed as one of the Mariners' top 10 prospects for the 2011 season, ranked fourth according to Baseball America. Prior to the 2012 season, he was ranked the second best prospect in the Mariners organization and the 20th best overall. Walker was selected to play in the 2012 All-Star Futures Game.

After Walker pitched to a 5–3 win–loss record and a 3.61 ERA with 64 strikeouts in  innings pitched for the Tacoma Rainiers of the Triple-A Pacific Coast League, the Mariners promoted Walker on August 30, 2013. Walker pitched 5 innings against the Houston Astros, and yielded just 2 hits and struck out 2. Walker was called up when rosters expanded in September 2013. He started 3 games, finishing the season with a 3.60 ERA in 15 innings. On September 24, 2014, Walker pitched his first MLB complete game, allowing one run in a 1–0 loss against the Toronto Blue Jays at Rogers Centre.

Walker began the 2015 season as a member of the Mariners' starting rotation. In his first start, at Oakland, Walker gave up nine runs in  innings. He followed that outing by giving up 5 runs in 4 innings against the Dodgers, causing some to question whether or not Walker was ready for the big leagues.  Walker continued to struggle, pitching more than 6 innings only once through his first nine starts. However, Walker won five straight starts in June and July, improving his record from 2–6 to 7–6. Walker struggled after winning five straight, going 0–1 with an 8.02 ERA, but on July 31, he threw a complete game one-hitter (his only hit was a home run by Miguel Sano) against the Minnesota Twins at Target Field. This time, his offense backed him up, as he won 6–1, striking out 11 only needing 100 pitches to do so. Overall, Walker finished the 2015 season with an 11–8 record despite posting a 4.56 ERA in 29 starts.

Throughout the first half of the 2016 season, Walker battled with a foot injury. He was placed on the 15-day disabled list on two occasions. He began the second half of the season on the disabled list. Before the all-star break, Walker had a 4–7 record despite a 3.66 ERA and 80 strikeouts in 86 innings. Walker was optioned to AAA on August 8, 2016. On September 13, 2016, Walker pitched his first career complete-game shutout in an 8–0 Mariners win over the Los Angeles Angels of Anaheim. He carried a perfect game into the sixth inning and a no-hitter into the seventh, finishing the game allowing no walks and three hits while striking out eleven batters.

Arizona Diamondbacks
On November 23, 2016, the Mariners traded Walker and Ketel Marte to the Arizona Diamondbacks for Jean Segura, Mitch Haniger, and Zac Curtis. In 2017, his first season in Arizona, Walker made 28 starts, pitching to a 9–9 record in 157 innings.

On April 15, 2018, Walker was placed on the 10-day disabled list due to right forearm tightness. Two days later, on April 17, it was revealed that Walker was diagnosed with a UCL injury in his right elbow. On April 18, it was revealed that Walker had a partial tear of the UCL in his right elbow. The injury required Tommy John surgery, bringing Walker's 2018 season to a premature end.

Following his Tommy John surgery, he appeared in one game for the Diamondbacks, the final game of the 2019 season. On December 2, 2019, Walker was non-tendered by Arizona and became a free agent.

On February 4, 2020, Walker worked out for 20 scouts from Major League teams.

Second stint with the Seattle Mariners
On February 12, 2020, Walker signed a one-year contract for $2 million to return to the Seattle Mariners.

Toronto Blue Jays
On August 27, 2020, the Mariners traded Walker to the Toronto Blue Jays for a player to be named later or cash considerations. On September 1, 2020, Toronto sent Alberto Rodríguez to Seattle to complete the trade. On August 29, 2020, he made his Blue Jays debut against the Baltimore Orioles, he threw six scoreless innings, allowing four hits. With the 2020 Toronto Blue Jays, Walker appeared in 6 games, compiling a 2–1 record with 1.37 ERA and 25 strikeouts in  innings pitched.

New York Mets
On February 20, 2021, Walker agreed to a two-year, $20 million contract with the New York Mets with a player option for the 2023 season. He was named to the 2021 Major League Baseball All-Star Game, replacing teammate Jacob deGrom. However, Walker's performance plummeted after the All-Star break; he posted a 7–3 record with a 2.66 ERA in the first half, and was 0–8 with a 7.13 ERA in the back half. He finished the 2021 season with a 7–11 record overall and a 4.47 ERA in 159 innings.

After hurting himself swinging right-handed, Walker began batting left-handed in August 2021. As a bunter, however, he still does so right-handed. On November 7, 2022, the Walker opted out of his contract with the Mets for the 2023 season and elected free agency.

Philadelphia Phillies 
On December 16, 2022, Walker agreed to a four-year contract worth $72 million with the Philadelphia Phillies.

International career

Walker played for Mexico in the 2023 World Baseball Classic. He started against Great Britain on March 14, giving up only one hit and striking out eight over four innings.

Scouting report
He throws a mid-90s four-seam fastball, a curveball, and a changeup. He has also begun to develop a sinker and cut fastball.

Personal life
Walker's father is black and his mother half-Mexican. Raised by his single mother, Walker helped care for his younger siblings.

Walker is a fan of the Pokémon and Star Wars franchises.

Walker and his wife, Heather Restrepo, welcomed their first child, a son, in July 2017. They then welcomed a second son in early November 2020.

References

External links

MiLB.com Profile

1992 births
Living people
African-American baseball players
American baseball players of Mexican descent
Arizona Diamondbacks players
Arizona League Mariners players
Baseball players from Shreveport, Louisiana
Baseball players from California
Clinton LumberKings players
High Desert Mavericks players
Jackson Generals (Southern League) players
Major League Baseball pitchers
New York Mets players
People from Yucaipa, California
Seattle Mariners players
Sportspeople from San Bernardino County, California
Surprise Saguaros players
Tacoma Rainiers players
Toronto Blue Jays players
21st-century African-American sportspeople
2023 World Baseball Classic players